Strempeliopsis arborea is a species of plant in the family Apocynaceae. It is endemic to Jamaica.

References

arborea
Vulnerable plants
Endemic flora of Jamaica
Taxonomy articles created by Polbot